On 29 December 2008, violent riots first broke out in Oslo, Norway amid protests against the Gaza War, starting outside the Israeli embassy.  Riots broke out again following a protest on 4 January 2009, while the most violent and destructive riots took place on 8 and 10 January when riots spread throughout the city with widespread destruction of private and public property, clashes between rioters and police with several injuries, as well as attacks on civilians, including individuals targeted due to being thought by rioters to be Jews.  Around 200 people were arrested in total, mainly Muslim youth, supported by left-wing autonomous Blitz activists.

Timeline of the riots
On 29 December 2008, around 1,000 anti-Israel protesters moved towards the Israeli embassy in Parkveien, where speeches were held by people including Inga Marte Thorkildsen of the Socialist Left Party. Other organisations behind the demonstration were the Red Party, Red Youth (RU), Socialist Youth (SU) and the Norwegian People's Aid. The protest turned violent when around 100 youth, mainly Blitz activists and "young boys" breached police roadblocks and began throwing Molotov cocktails and stones at the embassy and the police, striking several police officers, amid rioters heard shouting "allahu akbar". Gasoline was drawn from nearby cars to set fire to trash bins that were launched against the police. Three windows of the hairdressing salon of a well-known homosexual was smashed, with circumstances suggesting a hate crime. Police responded by firing tear gas at the rioters, and eventually detained nine youths of which four were arrested, including two asylum seekers.

On 4 January 2009, an anti-Israel demonstration arranged by the Palestine Committee of Norway, Red Party and Blitz began outside the Norwegian parliament building and then moved to the Israeli embassy. Members of the crowd grew violent, and around 200 protesters including Hezbollah supporters began throwing stones and shooting fireworks against the police. The rioters were dispersed by police firing tear gas, after receiving several warnings.

On 8 January, around 200 police officers were stationed out in anticipation of protests as a peaceful pro-Israel rally arranged by organisations such as With Israel for Peace (MIFF) was to be held outside the Norwegian parliament building, with the Progress Party leader Siv Jensen scheduled to give a pro-Israel speech. During Jensen's speech, anti-Israel activists started throwing rocks at the pro-Israel demonstrators, forcing Jensen to leave the podium. The police used tear gas when rioters attacked a bus that tried to evacuate pro-Israeli activists from the area, which included a large number of elderly demonstrators. A pro-Israel protester was attacked and injured by anti-Israel protesters shouting "take him, he's a Jew", "fucking Jew" and "allahu akbar". Among other slogans, protesters shouted "death to the Jews," "kill the Jews" and "slaughter the Jews" in Arabic. An additional fifteen police officers from the Asker and Bærum police district were eventually brought in for assistance. The final count reported forty shop windows to have been smashed in the riots, and several cars and buses damaged, including fifteen police cars. At least six people were reported to have been injured, of which five police officers, one mutilated in the face by an iron rod. Police said they had found several secret stashes of Molotov cocktails, club weapons and knives throughout Oslo during the evening. 37 mainly immigrant-background rioters were detained by the police, of which fifteen were brought into custody, and nine charged with violence against police.

On 9 and 10 January new anti-Israel demonstrations were arranged by an Islamo-leftist alliance of several organisations, including the Workers' Youth League (AUF), Red Party, Red Youth (RU), Socialist Youth (SU), Norwegian People's Aid, Islamic Association, and other pro-Palestine and Muslim organisations. Blitz stated openly that they supported the violent riots. On 10 January, 3,000 demonstrators were joined by the Norwegian Confederation of Trade Unions (LO) and Minister of Finance Kristin Halvorsen. The protest soon erupted into new riots as fireworks and rocks were thrown at the police and the Israeli embassy, with at least two people injured and several police officers struck by objects. The violence spread throughout Oslo, and numerous shop windows were smashed and cars damaged. Five McDonald's restaurants were destroyed in the riots because of a false rumor spread by text message that all the money McDonald's earned that day would go to support Israel. Some of the youngest rioters reported to have been told by older youths to "hunt for Jews", with one group severely beating up a shop owner accused of being a Jew. The Oslo Freemasonry Lodge, which hosted a children's Christmas party with 300 people was deliberately attacked with fireworks after crushing a window open, nearly causing a fire. The police detained 160 rioters during the evening, charging eleven with property damage and violence against police.

A total of 194 protesters were arrested during the 8 and 10 January riots. The police stated that they would investigate all the arrested and that most of them would receive fines of 9,000 NOK (around 1,300 USD). In the end, only ten rioters were prosecuted by the police, and less than ten convicted. The Oslo Trade Association called the small number of prosecutions by the police "unacceptable" and "deeply worrying".

Analysis and aftermath

In his book The Anti-Jewish Riots in Oslo (2010), Norwegian author and editor Eirik Eiglad, himself a socialist who was present in Oslo during the riots, wrote:

Police investigators noted similarities in the modus operandi of the Oslo riots with earlier riots in Paris and in the Middle East.

In cooperation with Norwegian education authorities, Islamic leaders in Norway initiated "dialogue meetings" with youths in mosques following the riots, with the aim of "using the Quran" to reach out to youths who had participated in the riots. Tariq Ramadan later visited Oslo and held speeches in the Rabita Mosque.

The riots have been credited by sociologists for "awakening" young Norwegian Muslims politically. Others have drawn connections to February 2010, when thousands of Oslo taxi drivers blocked the city centre, and 3,000 Muslims took part in an illegal demonstration against newspaper Dagbladet for publishing a Muhammad cartoon in the context of a news story about an internet link (which the newspaper strongly criticised), during which one of the speakers, Mohyeldeen Mohammad "warned" of a 9/11 or 7/7 in Norway. 

The riots have later been noted as an important shared experience and common denominator for many members of the Norwegian Salafi-jihadist group Profetens Ummah, and Norwegian jihadists in the Syrian Civil War. One participant in the riots, leftist turned-Muslim convert Anders Cameroon Østensvig Dale went on to become an internationally wanted terrorist as a bomb-maker for Al-Qaeda in the Arabian Peninsula (AQAP).

See also
2009 Malmö anti-Israel riots
Jews in Norway
Antisemitism in Norway
Immigration to Norway

References

External links
 Video: 29 December riots, 8 January riots, 10 January riots (Verdens Gang)
 Photo series: NRK

Political riots
Ethnic riots
Religious riots
2008 riots
2009 riots
2008 in Norway
2009 in Norway
Gaza War (2008–2009)
Antisemitic attacks and incidents in Europe
Antisemitism in Norway
Anti-Zionism in Norway
Islam and antisemitism
Islamism in Norway
Israel–Norway relations
Jews and Judaism in Oslo
2008 crimes in Norway
2009 crimes in Norway
Crime in Oslo
History of Oslo
December 2008 events in Europe
January 2009 events in Europe
Riots and civil disorder in Europe
Riots and civil disorder in Norway